Pass the Chicken & Listen is an album by The Everly Brothers, released in 1972. It was the last studio recording the brothers made for over 10 years.

It was re-released on CD by One Way Records in 1997. In 2014 it was reissued as a twofer CD with Stories We Could Tell by Morello Records.

Track listing

Side one
"Lay It Down" (Gene Thomas) – 3:18
"Husbands and Wives" (Roger Miller) – 2:23
"Woman Don't You Try to Tie Me Down" (Joe Allen) – 4:01
"Sweet Memories" (Mickey Newbury) – 2:55
"Ladies Love Outlaws" (Lee Clayton) – 3:13
"Not Fade Away" (Buddy Holly, Norman Petty) – 2:01

Side two
"Watchin' It Go" (Gene Thomas) – 2:26
"Paradise" (John Prine) – 3:37
"Somebody Nobody Knows" (Kris Kristofferson) – 3:37
"Good Hearted Woman" (Waylon Jennings, Willie Nelson) – 2:34
"A Nickel for the Fiddler" (Guy Clark) – 2:24
"Rocky Top" (Felice Bryant, Boudleaux Bryant) – 2:53

Personnel
Don Everly – acoustic guitar, vocals
Phil Everly – acoustic guitar, vocals
Chet Atkins – acoustic guitar
David Briggs – piano
Johnny Gimble – fiddle, mandolin
Ralph Gallant – drums
 Weldon Myrick  – pedal steel guitar
Hargus "Pig" Robbins – organ, piano
Hal Rugg – pedal steel guitar
Steve Schaffer – bass
Dale Sellers – acoustic guitar, dobro
Pete Wade – acoustic guitar
Paul Yandell – acoustic guitar
Bobby Thompson – acoustic guitar, banjo
Production
Chet Atkins – producer
David Kershenbaum – production assistant
Les Ladd – engineer
Bill Vandervort – engineer

References

1973 albums
The Everly Brothers albums
Albums produced by Chet Atkins
RCA Records albums